Radu Stanca (March 5, 1920 – December 26, 1962) was a Romanian poet, playwright, theatre director, theatre critic and theoretician. He was born in Sebeș and died in Cluj-Napoca.

Stanca was member of the Sibiu Literary Circle, a movement of young poets and essayists who tried, between 1946–1948, to rejuvenate the main literary style and aesthetical thinking. In 1947 he received the Lovinescu award for his tragicomedy Dona Juana. One of the leading Romanian theatres is the Radu Stanca National Theatre in Sibiu.

References

Ion Vartic, Radu Stanca. Poezie și teatru, București, Ed. Albatros, 1978

Romanian dramatists and playwrights
Romanian essayists
Romanian writers
1920 births
1962 deaths
20th-century Romanian dramatists and playwrights
20th-century essayists